is a Japanese footballer who plays for Matsumoto Yamaga.

Club statistics
Updated to 23 February 2018.

References

External links
 Profile at Shonan Bellmare

1987 births
Living people
People from Ichihara, Chiba
Shizuoka Sangyo University alumni
Association football people from Chiba Prefecture
Japanese footballers
J1 League players
J2 League players
Japan Football League players
Sagawa Shiga FC players
Matsumoto Yamaga FC players
Shonan Bellmare players
Association football goalkeepers